Raydel Hierrezuelo Aguirre (born July 14, 1987 in Havana City) is a volleyball player from Cuba, who plays as a setter. He twice won a bronze medal with the Men's National Team in 2007. In the national team has appeared in four editions of the World League (2007-2010).In 2009he received the award of the best player of the championship

References
 FIVB Profile

1987 births
Living people
Cuban men's volleyball players
Volleyball players at the 2007 Pan American Games
Volleyball players at the 2011 Pan American Games
Place of birth missing (living people)
Pan American Games silver medalists for Cuba
Pan American Games bronze medalists for Cuba
Pan American Games medalists in volleyball
Medalists at the 2011 Pan American Games
21st-century Cuban people